Alireza Alavian is an Iranian sound designer, sound editor and sound mixer.

Biography
Alireza began his career in cinema in 2001 as a sound assistant. Since 2003, he has been the sound mixer of "Salade Fasl" a program directed by Fereydoun Jeyrani. He has also worked with many other well-known Iranian directors. He has received numerous awards including the first International Sound Prize in Iranian cinema for sound design and sound editing of the short film "An Sooy e Bonbast (2012)" at the Best Shorts Competition - California Film Festival.

Awards and honors

Awards
 2010: Crystal Simorgh of 28th Fajr International Film Festival for Best Sound Mix & Editing for the film Anahita
 2011: Jury prize of Jam-e-Jam Television Festival for the Best Sound Editing for the film Stories and Varieties
 2012: Award of Merit for the Best Sound Editing for the film An Sooy e Bonbast
 2013: Golden Jasmine for the Best Sound Editing for the film Three Fish
 2014: Jury prize of Iran's Film Critics and Writers Association for the Best Achievement in Sound Mixing Che
 2014: Crystal Simorgh of 32nd Fajr International Film Festival for Best Sound Mix & Editing for the film Che
 2014: Golden Prize of Tehran International Animation Festival for the Best Sound Editing for the film They alive
 2017: Crystal Simorgh of 35th Fajr International Film Festival for Best Sound Mix & Editing for the film No Date, No Signature
 2018: Crystal Simorgh of 36th Fajr International Film Festival for Best Sound Mix & Editing for the films Damascus Time and Sheeple

Honors
 2007:Nominated Jury prize of 12th Iran Cinema Celebration for Best Sound Mix & Editing for the film Miss Iran
 2009:Nominated Crystal Simorgh of 28th Fajr International Film Festival for Best Sound Mix & Editing for the film Bidari-e Royaha
 2015:Nominated Crystal Simorgh of 33rd Fajr International Film Festival for Best Sound Mix & Editing for the film I Am Diego Maradona
 2019:Nominated Jury prize of 13th Cinema Vérité Film Festival for Best Sound Mix & Editing for the film Khosouf

Filmography

Cinema 
 2007: Santouri
 2012: I Am a Mother
 2012: The Last Step
 2012: Notoriety
 2013: The Corridor
 2014: Today
 2014: Che
 2015: Absolut Rest
 2015: Wednesday, May 9
 2016: Bodyguard
 2016: Salaam Mumbai
 2016: Malaria
 2016: Delighted
 2017: No Date, No Signature
 2017: A Man of Integrity
 2018: Damascus Time
 2018: The Last Fiction
 2018: 3 Faces
 2020: Atabai
 2020: Amphibious 
 2020: Killer Spider 
 2021: Without Everything 
 2021: Pinto
 2021: No Prior Appointment 
 2021: Shishlik 
 2022: Grassland
 2022: Killing a Traitor

Series
 2014 - 2018:  Shahrzad

See also 
 Iranian cinema

References

External links

Date of birth missing (living people)
Living people
Musicians from Tehran
Sound designers
Sound editors
Production sound mixers
Year of birth missing (living people)